Pallas Castle is a tower house and National Monument located in County Galway, Ireland.

Location

History

The castle was built by the Burkes c. 1500. In 1574 it was owned by Jonyck Fitzthomas Burke, but after the restoration it passed to the Nugent Earls of Westmeath. Near the tower at the west end, there is a rectangular flanker, an 18th-century malt house and the remains of a large 17th-century gabled house. Some buildings in the southwest corner probably date from the 19th century. The Burke family name lives on with the Burke family descendants living down the road and in surrounding areas.

Building

The tower is 5 storeys high, with the third storey vaulted. The thick end wall contains a tier of mural chambers and a winding stair.
   
There are a number of good fireplaces preserved on the various floors.

The fourth floor has attractive mullioned windows framed in arches. The roof was still thatched in the early part of the 20th century, the bottom being covered with stone flags for protection.

The tower is surrounded by a well-preserved bawn, entered via a two-storey gatehouse. The bawn has two towers with turrets at each corner, and has internal steps and parapets.

References

External links

National Monuments in County Galway
Castles in County Galway